WNU may refer to the following:

 World Nuclear University, a "Partnership for Sustainable Development" aimed to further the cause of the peaceful applications of nuclear technologies.
 Warren National University, a university in the United States
 West Negros University, a university in the Philippines now known as STI West Negros University
 Wold Newton Universe
 Worldwide News Ukraine, a Ukrainian news agency